The John Carroll School Inc., established in 1964 and incorporated in 1971, is a private Catholic school for grades 9–12. It is located in Bel Air, Harford County, Maryland, United States in the Roman Catholic Archdiocese of Baltimore.

History
In the early 1960s Lawrence Shehan decided to build an Archdiocesan Catholic high school on an  site in Bel Air. The John Carroll School opened to 202 freshmen on September 9, 1964, under the leadership of Raymond Wanner. From its earliest days, the school was run both by clergy and lay people.

The school is named after John Theodore Carroll, the first Catholic bishop and archbishop in the United States, serving as the ordinary of the Roman Catholic Archdiocese of Baltimore.

Notable alumni
 Suzan-Lori Parks, playwright
 Mark F. Ramsay, former Lieutenant General of United States Air Force
 Zach Thornton, former goalie for Chicago Fire of Major League Soccer
 Drew Westervelt, professional lacrosse player
 Immanuel Quickley, basketball player for the New York Knicks
 Isaiah Philmore, professional basketball player.

References

External links
 

Bel Air, Harford County, Maryland
Educational institutions established in 1964
Private schools in Harford County, Maryland
Catholic secondary schools in Maryland
Middle States Commission on Secondary Schools
1964 establishments in Maryland